Ljubivoje Ršumović (Serbian Cyrillic: Љубивоје Ршумовић; born 3 July 1939) is a Serbian poet and writer.

Ršumović is predominantly a writer and poet for children; however, a portion of his work is literature for adults.

Biography
He was born on 3 July 1939 in the village of Ljubiš in the Zlatibor Mountains. His parents were Mihailo and Milesa Ršumović. He was educated in Ljubiš, Čajetina, Užice, and Belgrade. He has a bachelor's degree from the University of Belgrade's Faculty of Philology. He is known as author of lyrics of anthem of Red Star Belgrade.

Selected works
 Ma šta mi reče
 Još nam samo ale fale
 Domovina se brani lepotom
 Ujdurme i zvrčke iz antičke Grčke
 Sunčanje na mesečini
 Tri čvora na trepavici
 Zauvari
 Vidovite priče
 Što na umu, to na drumu
 Provale i cake
 Izvolte u bajku sa čika Ršumom

References

External links 
 

1939 births
Living people
People from Čajetina
Serbian male poets
Serbian children's writers
Serbian writers
University of Belgrade Faculty of Philology alumni